Gul Ahmad Saeed (born 1990) is a suspected Pakistani mass murderer who killed 14 people. On November 28, 2014, Saeed is believed to have murdered his parents, brother, and sister-in-law when they obstructed his marriage. After the murders, he went on the run. On April 5, 2015, Saeed, along with some accomplices, murdered his fiancé and nine of her relatives. All of them were shot by a Kalashnikov rifle.

References

External links
Man kills parents, two brothers, DAWN (November 29, 2014)
Ten of a family killed in Charsadda over refusal of marriage proposal, DAWN (April 5, 2015)
Marriage feud claims 10 lives in Charsadda village, DAWN (April 6, 2015)
Five held over 10 killings, DAWN (April 16, 2015)
3 accused held in murder case of 10 family members, The News International (April 16, 2015)
10 of a family murder case - Three brothers of main accused turned up as real killers, The Frontier Post (April 16, 2015)

1990 births
Living people
Familicides
Mass murder in 2015
Pakistani mass murderers
Murder in Pakistan